Olivier Rousteing (born September 13, 1985) is a French fashion designer. He has been the creative director of Balmain since 2011.

Early life and education
Rousteing was adopted by his parents at the age of 1. Rousteing's mother is an optician, while his father is a seaport manager. He grew up in Bordeaux and moved to Paris to study at ESMOD (Ecole Supérieure des Arts et Techniques de la Mode). Like Jacquemus, he dropped out in his first year citing lack of creative freedom.

Career

Early beginnings
In 2003, Rousteing began his career at Roberto Cavalli, where he was promoted to creative director of the Italian label's women's ready-to-wear collection, serving for five years in that position.

Balmain, 2009–present
Rousteing joined Balmain in 2009. During his early time at Balmain he worked closely with Christophe Decarnin, then the French fashion house's creative director.

On 26 April 2011, at 25 years old, Rousteing replaced Decarnin as the creative director of Balmain. While he liked Decarnin's aesthetic, he wanted to orient the label towards the finer aspects of French couture. At the time of his appointment, Rousteing was a relatively unknown designer, and brought a much-needed fresh take on the brand's aesthetic that remains to this day. He has been credited with adding an Asian influence to the clothing, as Asia comprises a huge part of the brand's buyers. Rousteing says his age, initial anonymity, and especially race led to grumblings amongst the fashion establishment. "People were like, 'Oh my God, he's a minority taking over a French house!'" Rousteing told Out magazine in 2015.

Since his arrival, menswear now accounts for 40 percent of Balmain's revenue. While the company did not release figures, it was estimated that Balmain's revenue increased 15 to 20 percent between 2012 and 2015. Rousteing opened a Balmain store in London, Balmain's first stand-alone boutique outside of Paris. A New York City store opened in SoHo in April 2016. Other stores are in the planning stage.

With the help of A-List celebrity friends like Kim Kardashian, Kelly Rowland, Jennifer Lopez, Rihanna, Björk, Beyoncé, Justin Bieber, Nicki Minaj, Chris Brown, EMFAM and various models, including those from Victoria's Secret, Rousteing helped Balmain become the first French label surpass one million followers on Instagram.

In 2022, Rousteing signed with the Creative Artists Agency “to explore new business-building opportunities in entertainment and popular culture that are complementary to his role as Balmain creative director.”

Other activities
Rousteing designed the costumes for the opera, Renaissance – a 27-minute ballet with 22 dancers, which was choreographed by Sébastien Bertaud and opened at Opéra de Paris on June 13, 2017.

Personal life
Rousteing was adopted and is gay. Though he had previously believed he was mixed race because of his skin colour, in 2019, he discovered that he is fully African, with a Somali birth mother and an Ethiopian birth father. The 2021 Netflix documentary Wonder Boy, written and directed by Anissa Bonnefont, examines his professional career and his search for his biological mother, who was aged 15 when she had him.

References

External links 
 Avec  Olivier Rousteing, Le Petit Journal, Canal Plus
En el despacho, Código Único

French fashion designers
French people of Somali descent
French people of Ethiopian descent
1985 births
Living people
Menswear designers
LGBT fashion designers